The Law of Protection of Commerce and Investments from Foreign Policies that Contravene International Law is the law passed by the government of Mexico in response to the Helms-Burton Act, a United States federal law. The Helms-Burton Act, passed in March 1996, was designed to strengthen the United States embargo against Cuba.

The law was published on October 23, 1996 in the Official Journal of the Federation during the Ernesto Zedillo administration. In its first article, this law explicitly prohibits individuals or organizations, whether public or private, that are within the borders of Mexico from participating in any action that affects commerce or investment if those acts correspond to the application of laws of foreign countries.

Sheraton Hotel incident
The first instance of a violation to this law happened almost ten years later when employees of the American-owned María Isabel Sheraton Hotel of Mexico City expelled a group of Cuban officials upon pressure from the United States government and confiscated their funds. The Cuban officials were meeting U.S. energy executives from organizations that included Valero, the United States' biggest oil refiner, the Louisiana Department of Economic Development, and the Texas port of Corpus Christi.

Voices of opposition were soon heard from the government of Mexico, the Government of Cuba, and most candidates in the 2006 presidential election. The Chamber of Deputies publicly condemned the violation of Mexican law and the rights of a group of consumers who were subjected to discrimination. On February 7, the United States Department of State declared on this matter that American law imposed upon American companies is applied regardless of the location of the company.

See also
 Law of Mexico
 Foreign Extraterritorial Measures Act (FEMA), a similar act passed in Canada.

External links
  Complete text of the law (Microsoft Word document) at the site of the Mexican Chamber of Deputies
 Cuba-U.S. Energy Meeting Changes Venues on the site of WTOP
  Justifica EU expulsión de cubanos del hotel Sheraton ("United States justifies the expulsion of Cubans from Sheraton Hotel"), article on El Universal
  Condenarán diputados expulsión de cubanos ("Deputies will condemn expulsion of Cubans"), article on El Universal
  Calderón, Campa y Mercado demandan una investigación ("Calderón, Campa and Mercado demand an investigation"), article on La Jornada

1996 in Mexico
1996 in law
Law of Mexico
Cuba–Mexico relations
Mexico–United States relations
Foreign relations of Mexico
Boycotts of Cuba